The canton of Les Monts du Livradois is an administrative division of the Puy-de-Dôme department, central France. It was created at the French canton reorganisation which came into effect in March 2015. Its seat is in Courpière.

It consists of the following communes:
 
Aix-la-Fayette
Aubusson-d'Auvergne
Augerolles
Auzelles
Bertignat
Brousse
Le Brugeron
Ceilloux
Chambon-sur-Dolore
La Chapelle-Agnon
Condat-lès-Montboissier
Courpière
Cunlhat
Domaize
Échandelys
Fayet-Ronaye
Fournols
Grandval
Marat
Le Monestier
Néronde-sur-Dore
Olmet
Olliergues
La Renaudie
Saint-Amant-Roche-Savine
Saint-Bonnet-le-Bourg
Saint-Bonnet-le-Chastel
Sainte-Catherine
Saint-Éloy-la-Glacière
Saint-Flour-l'Étang
Saint-Germain-l'Herm
Saint-Gervais-sous-Meymont
Saint-Pierre-la-Bourlhonne
Sauviat
Sermentizon
Tours-sur-Meymont
Vertolaye
Vollore-Ville

References

Cantons of Puy-de-Dôme